Stjørdalens Blad is a local newspaper published in Stjørdal, Norway. It covers Stjørdal and Meråker. It was established in 1892.

It has a circulation of 7634, of whom 7023 are subscribers.

Stjørdalens Blad is owned by A-pressen Lokale Medier AS, which in turn is owned 100% by A-pressen.

References 

 Norwegian Media Registry

External links
 Website

1892 establishments in Norway
Amedia
Daily newspapers published in Norway
Mass media in Trøndelag
Meråker
Newspapers established in 1892
Norwegian-language newspapers
Stjørdal